Iola is an extinct town in Gunnison County, in the U.S. state of Colorado. The community was inundated and destroyed by the creation of Blue Mesa Reservoir.

A post office called Iola was established in 1896, and remained in operation until 1963. The name Iola reportedly was selected simply on account of it being a pleasant name.

References

Ghost towns in Colorado
Geography of Gunnison County, Colorado